Soalala Airport is an airport in Soalala, Boeny Region, Madagascar .

Airlines and destinations

References

Airports in Madagascar
Boeny